The Nintendo eShop is a digital distribution service powered by the Nintendo Network for the Wii U and Nintendo 3DS, and by a dedicated online infrastructure for the Nintendo Switch. Launched in June 2011 on the Nintendo 3DS, the eShop was enabled by the release of a system update that added the functionality to the Nintendo 3DS's HOME Menu. It is the successor to both the Wii Shop Channel and DSi Shop. Unlike on the Nintendo 3DS, the eShop was made available on the launch date of the Wii U, although a system update is required in order to access it. It is also a multitasking application, which means it is easily accessible even when a game is already running in the background through the system software, though this feature is exclusive to the Wii U and the Nintendo Switch. The Nintendo eShop features downloadable games, demos, applications, streaming videos, consumer rating feedback, and other information on upcoming game releases.

A limited variant of the Nintendo eShop for the Nintendo 3DS family was discontinued on July 31, 2020, for various Latin American and Caribbean markets, as well as for the Southeast Asian and Middle Eastern markets. A limited variant of the Nintendo eShop for the Wii U was also discontinued at the same day for said Latin American and Caribbean markets. As of that date, the ability to download, redownload, and update any software became unavailable, and games using the eShop were also affected. It was later announced on July 19, 2022, that the ability to purchase, download, and play new content on the Nintendo eShop for the Wii U and the Nintendo 3DS would be discontinued for the rest of the world on March 27, 2023, with the ability to add credit cards ceasing by May 23, 2022, followed by the inability to add funds by August 29, of the same year (except for users who linked their Nintendo Network ID with their Nintendo Account, who can add funds until March 27, 2023). Redownloading previously purchased content,updating and free themes will remain available.

Features 
Initially, the two versions of the Nintendo eShop between the Nintendo 3DS and Wii U were independent of each other. Whilst this remains largely true, after the implementation of Nintendo Network ID for the Nintendo 3DS, users that register the same ID account between both systems (currently at one time per console) can share a combined funds balance, home address, saved credit and debit card information, wish list entries, and (formerly) linked Club Nintendo accounts. With the release of the Nintendo Switch version of the Nintendo eShop, the balance stored on a Nintendo Network ID can be shared or transferred to a Nintendo Account to be spent on the Nintendo Switch.

The eShop stores a record of all downloads and purchases, allowing users to re-download previously purchased software at no additional charge, provided the software is still available on the eShop. Downloads can be started immediately, or they can be queued up and be pushed to the console while it is not in use or when the eShop application is not running. Users upgrading from a Nintendo DSi system can transfer their previous DSiware purchases to the Nintendo 3DS, with limited exceptions, such as Flipnote Studio. A December 2011 update enabled a similar feature allowing users to transfer their purchases between 3DS systems. Before the implementation of Nintendo Network ID for the Nintendo 3DS in December 2013, only five transfers between Nintendo 3DS systems were permitted. The limit on system transfers has since been permanently waived.

Availability

Nintendo eShop is available in 51 countries:

  Argentina
  Australia
  Austria
  Belgium
  Brazil
  Bulgaria*
  Canada
  Chile
  China 
  Colombia
  Croatia
  Cyprus*
  Czech Republic
  Denmark
  Estonia*
  Finland

  France
  Germany
  Greece
  Hong Kong
  Hungary
  Ireland
  Israel
  Italy
  Japan
  Latvia*
  Lithuania*
  Luxembourg*
  Malta*
  Mexico
  Netherlands
  New Zealand

  Norway
  Peru*
  Philippines*
  Poland
  Portugal
  Romania*
  Russia
  Singapore
  Slovakia
  Slovenia*
  South Africa
  South Korea
  Spain
  Sweden
  Switzerland
  Taiwan

  Thailand
  United Kingdom
  United States

'*' = Country where Nintendo Account service and Nintendo eShop are officially available, but in Global currency (USD/EUR), not in local currency.

Currency 
Unlike the Wii Shop Channel and the DSi Shop services, which use Nintendo Points for purchases, the Nintendo eShop lists prices in the appropriate regional currencies (e.g. United States dollars and euros). Accounts can be funded using either credit cards or prepaid cards purchased in stores.

In China, the Nintendo eShop was opened on December 10, 2019. Users can only log in with a WeChat account, and the account can only be funded via WeChat Pay. In addition, purchasing downloadable content from other regions is disabled due to the lack of the ability to sign in with a Nintendo Account and the general region locking of the Nintendo Switch for the Chinese market.

Multitasking 
The Nintendo eShop can be accessed any time via the HOME menu screen, even when a game is already running, on Wii U and Nintendo Switch. Background downloading is also possible via SpotPass while using any other application on the Wii U or Nintendo 3DS, and while in Sleep Mode on Nintendo Switch. Currently, 10 downloads can be queued at a time. The status of the downloads can be checked on the HOME menu under the "Download Manager". If notifications are activated, a pop-up message will appear in the top right corner of the screen to notify the user that a download is finished.

Ratings 
The Nintendo eShop supports user reviews of games, applications, and other media. After an eShop title has been acquired and used for at least one hour, users can then submit a review consisting of a crescent range of one to five "stars", representing the title's quality. Users can also categorize games by age and gender, and as being suitable for either hardcore or casual gamers. The Wii U had Miiverse integration for user reviews on the Nintendo eShop.

Deluxe Digital Promotion and Nintendo Network Premium 

On September 13, 2012, during a Japanese Nintendo Direct presentation, Satoru Iwata introduced a new service called Deluxe Digital Promotion (North America)/Nintendo Network Premium (Europe, Australia, and Japan). It was a loyalty program similar to PlayStation Plus offered on PlayStation Network and Xbox Live Gold on Xbox Live.

Consumers who purchased the Wii U Deluxe Pack in North America, or the Wii U Premium Pack in Europe and Japan, would receive a free two-year subscription to this service which lets Wii U owners receive points for each digital purchase.

Members who bought games and apps through the Wii U Nintendo eShop would receive ten percent of the price back in the form of Nintendo Points, which could subsequently be put towards future online purchases on both the Wii U and Nintendo 3DS eShop. The promotion was available through March 31, 2015.

The program was discontinued on April 1, 2015, and the URL just leads to a discontinuation message and the reader gets a link to Nintendo's official website. The service was never fully implemented beyond its promotional period. The My Nintendo program features a similar concept for anyone who links their Nintendo Network ID to their Nintendo Account profile, where users can earn Gold Points via any Nintendo eShop purchase and redeem them for full downloads or discount coupons available.

List of available content 
The following types of games, applications and media are available to download from the Nintendo eShop (or  Wii Shop Channel in the Wii U's Wii Mode before it's discontinuation):

Downloadable software

Retail releases 

The majority of Wii U, Nintendo 3DS, Nintendo Switch, and select Wii retail releases are on the Nintendo eShop. The first is New Super Mario Bros. 2, launched on the Nintendo 3DS eShop alongside its retail release in August 2012. A system update in March 2013 allowed players to transfer save data from a physical version of a game to a download version.

Download-only releases 
Any video game company, particularly independent video game developers, may publish via the Nintendo eShop as download-only software for the Nintendo 3DS, Wii U, and Nintendo Switch. Various games, which may be sold as retail games in some regions, might be released as download-only software in others for various reasons, such as cost-effective localization.

3D Classics 

3D Classics is a series of NES/Famicom, Arcade, Sega Mega Drive/Genesis, and Sega Master System/SG-1000 games remade with added 3D visuals and updated features, although the overall graphics retain their original art style and appearance. These are exclusive to the Nintendo 3DS family.

Add-on content 
Add-on content includes downloadable content (DLC) or microtransactions to augment existing games with new features, and patches. This content can both be free to download or purchasable. Add-on software can be added to both downloadable and physical games, and be purchased either individually or via in-game stores.

Demos 
As of December 6, 2011, a system update upgraded the service to feature downloadable demos of retail games and eShop games. Developers have the option to limit access to demos, such as limiting the number of plays available to the user. When the number of plays reaches zero, the demo cannot be opened. The first paid demo was released in Japan on August 4, 2011, and free demos were further released in Japan on December 27, of the same year and in North America on January 19, 2012. As of December 9, 2013, Nintendo Network IDs were implemented onto the Nintendo 3DS, becoming required for downloading free demos from the eShop.

Software updates 
Software updates, more commonly known as patches, have been available on both Nintendo 3DS, since April 25, 2012, and Wii U, since November 18, 2012, via a system update. These system updates gave the ability to patch downloadable and retail releases, through both the Nintendo eShop and HOME Menu. These patches have the main purpose of fixing security vulnerabilities and other bugs and improving usability or performance. Patches can also be downloaded while using other applications via the systems' Download Manager.

Virtual Console 

, sometimes abbreviated as VC, is a specialized section of the Nintendo eShop that allows players to purchase and download games and other software for Nintendo's Wii U and Nintendo 3DS consoles.

Wii U 
The Wii U uses the Wii U Menu and Nintendo eShop to access and purchase Virtual Console games, respectively. Virtual Console games on the Wii U can be suspended and users can also create save states anytime. The GamePad is only compatible with these games through Off-TV Play.

Select games from the NES, SNES, Nintendo 64, Game Boy Advance, and Nintendo DS libraries are available for purchase on the eShop. Most of the Virtual Console library available on the original Wii is also available on Wii U through the implementation of the console's Wii Mode and Wii Shop Channel, to access and purchase Virtual Console games. Wii Virtual Console games cannot be controlled using the Wii U GamePad, though the current versions of the system software support displaying Wii Virtual Console games on the GamePad screen as if playing any other Wii game.

Nintendo 3DS 
The Nintendo 3DS uses the Home Menu and Nintendo eShop to access and purchase Virtual Console games, respectively. Virtual Console games on the Nintendo 3DS can be suspended and users can also create save states anytime. Functionality is available to display the games at native resolution.

Currently, games for the Game Boy, Game Boy Color, Game Boy Advance (for Nintendo 3DS Ambassadors only) NES, SNES (New Nintendo 3DS exclusive), Sega Game Gear, and Turbografx16 (Japan only) are available on the eShop.

Twenty free NES and GBA games are available to 3DS owners who became eligible in the Ambassador Program (users who logged onto the Nintendo eShop before August 12, 2011, and did not erase their eShop details). Special features in this interpretation of the Virtual Console allow players to create Restore Points, temporarily saving the game state for use later, and the optional ability to view games in their original resolution accompanied with special borders or templates.

Game Boy Advance games can be displayed at their original screen resolution like other Virtual Console games but they do not support Sleep Mode, Restore Points, and Home Menu functionality while the game is running.

WiiWare 

WiiWare, for the Wii video game console, has been available for the Wii U since launch day when an update added support for the Wii Shop Channel's library of WiiWare games. Unlike DSiWare on the Nintendo 3DS, WiiWare software is only available for download on the Wii U through Wii Mode, not the Nintendo eShop. Similarly to using Wii software on the Wii U, WiiWare can only be played in its original resolution, via Wii Mode, and Wii U Home Menu functionality is disabled while WiiWare software is being played. Prior to the Wii Shop Channel's closure, there were over 450 downloadable games available in North America . Initially all games except LostWinds were published on the Wii U. LostWinds had since been patched and made available for transfer and purchase on the Wii U. It was discontinued in January 2019.

DSiWare 

DSiWare, for the Nintendo DSi handheld game console, has been available for the Nintendo 3DS since June 2011, when the Nintendo eShop was first introduced. With a few exceptions for certain games or applications such as Flipnote Studio, the majority of existing DSiWare software is available for download on the Nintendo 3DS through the Nintendo eShop. Similar to using Nintendo DS software, DSiWare can be optionally viewed in its original resolution and Home Menu functionality, SpotPass, StreetPass, Auto Brightness (New Nintendo 3DS only) and 3D Functionality is disabled whilst DSiWare software is being played. There are over 550 downloadable DSiWare games available in North America as of January 2016. DSiWare games and software on the Nintendo eShop are largely priced near-identically as on the original DSi Shop. Online functionality has been defunct in DSiWare games due to the Nintendo Wi-Fi Connection service ceasing operations as of May 20, 2014.

Video services 
The Nintendo eShop offers a wide range of video streaming applications, which correspond to third party streaming services. Some of these services' applications are available for download on Nintendo 3DS and are preinstalled on North American Wii U consoles, such as Netflix, Hulu, and Amazon Prime Video applications. These streaming services are available independently from Nintendo Network services.

Additionally, some videos can either be downloaded to the system's memory through SpotPass. On the Nintendo 3DS, many of these videos are offered in autostereoscopic 3D; on the Wii U, only 2D high definition videos are available. The exact content available varies by region.

Discontinued services 
 SpotPass TV –  ceased operations on June 20, 2012.
 Eurosport –  ceased operations on December 31, 2012.
 Hulu Plus shut down in 2015 for the Wii U and 3DS.

Nintendo Unleashed 

Nintendo Unleashed was a video gaming online magazine published by Future Publishing for Nintendo Network. It is produced by the team behind the Official Nintendo Magazine and features video reviews and previews and footage of upcoming and recently released Nintendo games. Episodes are released monthly on the Nintendo eShop, Nintendo Channel and YouTube where users can watch all the latest news, reviews and previews of Wii, Wii U, Nintendo DS, Nintendo 3DS and Virtual Console games. The show's original name and format was called Nintendo TV. The show ended sometime in 2014 before the Official Nintendo Magazine ceased publication.

Nintendo Show 3D 
Nintendo Show 3D was a video gaming online show produced by Nintendo and hosted by Jessie Cantrell. It featured video previews and footage of upcoming and recently released Nintendo 3DS retail and downloadable games. Episodes were released every two weeks on the Nintendo eShop free of charge. This series was exclusive to North American Nintendo 3DS consoles. Nintendo Show 3D released its last episode on March 28, 2013, two years after the North American release of the original Nintendo 3DS.

Nintendo eShop News 
Japan exclusive news video conferences hosted by Satoru Iwata.

Short films 
The Nintendo eShop offers a wide range of downloadable video content for the Nintendo 3DS. These videos are mostly offered in 3D and are downloaded to the system's storage. To produce and distribute these short films, Nintendo partnered with companies such as Breakthru Films, Black Box Productions, Atlantic Productions, Ka-Ching Cartoons and DreamWorks Animation.

Litigation
The Norwegian Consumer Council (NCC) filed suit against Nintendo in February 2018, asserting that the eShop's policy on pre-order refunds violated European consumer law. As the NCC outlined, while European law requires digital storefronts to provide refunds on pre-orders, Nintendo bypassed this for the Switch eShop by having the user click an acknowledgement checkbox that waived their rights to refunds. NCC argued this violated the EU's Consumer Rights Directive 2011 as all pre-orders must be able to be refunded. Nintendo cited that under the directive that offering the checkbox to waive this right was valid. The German Federation of Consumer Organisation (Verbraucherzentrale Bundesverband e. V., or VBEV) took the lead on the lawsuit by December 2018 as Nintendo's European headquarters were located in Großostheim.

The Regional Court of Frankfurt ruled in December 2019 for Nintendo, but both the NCC and VBEV appealed the decision. During the appeal, in September 2020 Nintendo changed its pre-order policy to allow refunds for games but only before a week before the game is scheduled for release. Despite this change, the Higher Regional Court of Frankfurt reversed the lower court's decision and ruled against Nintendo in December 2021, stating that its policy still violated the EU consumer's directive, as "the prerequisites for the right of revocation were not met, as the download made available after the pre-order did not yet contain any usable game."

See also
Nintendo Network
PlayStation Store
Xbox Games Store

Notes

References

Nintendo eShop
Nintendo 3DS
Nintendo Network
Online-only retailers of video games
Retail companies established in 2011
Internet properties established in 2011
Wii U
Nintendo Switch